The King Opera House is a performance hall located on Van Buren, Arkansas's Main Street. Since it was built in the late 19th century, the opera house's stage has hosted many plays and performers. The King Opera House is a contributing property to the Van Buren Historic District, listed on the National Register of Historic Places.

Architecture
The Victorian-era structure first opened its doors in the late 19th century, and has since undergone extensive restoration prior to reopening for use in 1979.  The auditorium of the opera house has numerous seats on ground level, with additional seating in the balcony; all with an intricate, period-correct design.  Built for large and well-sized performances on its stage, the opera house's basement, in contrast, has two couches and two small closet-sized dressing rooms.  The basement can be highly cramped, in its relatively modest changing area and green room, particularly for productions with large casts.

References

External links
Young Actors Guild

Opera houses in Arkansas
Buildings and structures in Van Buren, Arkansas
Performing arts centers in Arkansas
Historic district contributing properties in Arkansas
Theatres completed in 1880
Music venues completed in 1880
Tourist attractions in Crawford County, Arkansas
National Register of Historic Places in Crawford County, Arkansas